Nasrat Ghazi Mosque is a 15th-century one-domed mosque and archaeological site located in the village of Middle Sialguni in Bakerganj Upazila, part of the Barisal District of southern Bangladesh. The mosque was built during the reign of Sultan Nasiruddin Nasrat Shah.

Architecture
This one-domed mosque is built on a square ground-plan which acts as an eidgah. The mosque is made of lime mortar and thin square bricks. The length-width of the interior of the mosque is a little over 4.50 meters and 14 feet, while the walls are 1.43 meters or about 5 feet thick. The exterior of the mosque has four octagonal pillars in the four corners. There are arched entrances on the east, south and north sides. However, the north and south entrances are currently being used as two windows. The inner western wall of the mosque has a mihrab. In addition, there are 4 small mihrabs and lamps on the north and south walls. The walls, cornices and pillars of the mosque are decorated with flowers and foliage.

History
The mosque was constructed in 1532, the final year of Sultan Nasiruddin Nasrat Shah's reign. It is said Nasrat Ghazi established this mosque, from who it gets its name from. To the north, west and south side of the mosque, there are ancient graves although none of them belong to Nasrat Ghazi.

The mosque is now under the protection of the Department of Archaeology, though it continues to be actively used by worshippers, even for iftar gatherings and tarawih sessions. The mosque was renovated in 2000, and again in 2015. A modern building has been constructed next to the mosque to increase the capacity of worshippers for daily prayers although the Nasrat Gazi mosque acts as the main prayer hall for the imam.

Gallery

See also
 List of archaeological sites in Bangladesh

References

Mosques in Bangladesh
Barishal District
Archaeological sites in Barisal district
Bengal Sultanate mosques
Hussain Shahi dynasty
Mosques completed in the 1530s